The Bishopric of Dorpat was a medieval prince-bishopric, i.e. both a diocese of the Roman Catholic Church and a temporal principality ruled by the bishop of the diocese. It existed from 1224 to 1558, generally encompassing the area that now comprises Tartu County, Põlva County, Võru County, and Jõgeva County in Estonia. The prince-bishopric was a sovereign member of the Holy Roman Empire (formally from 6 Nov 1225) and part of the Livonian Confederation until its dissolution in 1561.

History 

The first Bishop of Dorpat (the current Tartu) was Hermann von Buxhövden, the brother of Albert von Buxhövden, Bishop of Riga and leader of the Livonian Crusade. The Estonian Diocese was established by the Bishop of Riga in 1211 and its first nominal seat was Leal (Lihula) in western Estonia. In 1224, Bishop Hermann took possession of parts of what is today southeastern Estonia and chose Dorpat as his new seat. On 6 November 1225 he was enfeoffed with his principality by Henry VII of Germany, King of the Romans, and on 1 December Dorpat was created a March of the Holy Roman Empire. The principality was founded mainly on territories of the Ugaunian tribe of ancient Estonians. In 1242, Bishop Hermann with his Ugaunian subjects was defeated by Novgorod's prince Alexander Nevsky in the famous Battle on Lake Peipus.

During 1268, Fredrik, the then Bishop of Dorpat, is known to have called himself also as the "Bishop of Karelia", the background of the short-lived title remaining open.

The Bishopric of Dorpat was an important Hanseatic trade center.

At the end of the 14th century, former Dietrich Damerow became the Bishop of Dorpat. He was the archenemy of the Livonian Order and made a coalition against it with Lithuania, Mecklenburg,  and the Victual Brothers (notorious pirates of the Baltic Sea). He even asked King Richard II of England to take Dorpat under his protection. The Order invaded the bishopric in 1379 with no success. After settling the conflict the Livonian Order lost its right to demand that vassals of bishoprics take part in military campaigns.

During its last years, the Bishopric of Dorpat had a dispute with Russia which became later the main pretext of the Livonian War. Tsar Ivan the Terrible demanded that the bishopric pay a huge tribute of 40,000 talers.  Ivan insisted that the Dorpat was the ancient Russian fortress of Yuryev (referring to the short-lived Rus' rule of the area after its conquest by Yaroslav I the Wise, 1030–61(?)). The rulers of Dorpat tried to negotiate a smaller amount in the interest of extending the truce, but Ivan dismissed the diplomats and started the war. In 1558 Tartu was conquered by Russian troops and the Bishopric of Dorpat ceased to exist.

Beside Dorpat (Tartu) there were five more stone castles in the Bishopric:
 Odenpäh as the ancient centre of Ugandi and the first stone stronghold of bishopric;
 Kirrumpäh (Kirumpää) and Neuhausen (Vastseliina) by the important ancient Dorpat–Pleskau (Tartu–Pihkva) road;
 Oldentorn (Vana-Kastre) and Warbeke or Caster (Uue-Kastre) by the Emajõgi river which runs from Dorpat to Lake Peipus.

There was also an outstanding Cistercian monastery, Kärkna Abbey (also Valkena or Falkenau)  near Dorpat.

The former Bishopric today 
The center of the bishopric was the Tartu (Dorpat) castle. The castle was damaged during the Northern War and was dismantled during the 18th century. Later (at the beginning of 19th century) an observatory was built on the site. The seat of the bishopric, Dorpat Cathedral, was damaged during the Protestant Reformation and has been in ruins since the 17th century.

Bishops of Dorpat 
Hermann von Buxhöwden 1224–48
Alexander 1263–68
Friedrich von Haseldorf 1268–88
Bernhard I 1289–1302
Dietrich I Vyshusen 1302–12
Nikolaus 1312–23
Engelbert von Dolen 1323–41
Wescelus 1342–1344
Johannes I Viffhusen 1346–73
Heinrich I von Velde 1373–78
Dietrich II Damerow 1378–1400
Heinrich II Wrangel 1400–10
Bernhard II Bülow 1410–13
Dietrich III Resler 1413–41
Bartholomäus Savijerwe 1441–59
Helmich von Mallinckrodt 1459–68
Andreas Pepler 1468–73
Johannes II Bertkow 1473–85
Dietrich V Hake 1485–98
Johannes III von der Rope 1499–1505
Gerhard Schrove 1505–13
Johannes IV Duesborg 1513–14
Christian Bomhower 1514–18
Johannes V Blankenfeld 1518–27
Johannes VI Bey 1528–43
Jodokus von der Recke 1544–51
Hermann II Wesel 1552–60

References

Sources and external links 
 World Statesmen Estonia: Prince-bishopric of Dorpat (Tartu)
 GigaCatholic Diocese of Dorpat

1558 disestablishments
States and territories established in 1224
Former Roman Catholic dioceses in Europe
Pre-Reformation dioceses in Nordic Europe
Roman Catholic bishops in the Holy Roman Empire
Livonian Confederation
Geographic history of Estonia
Prince-bishoprics in Livonia
13th-century establishments in Estonia
History of Tartu